Maxence Muzaton (born 26 June 1990) is a French World Cup alpine ski racer. He specializes in the speed events of Downhill and Super-G, and also competes in the Combined event.

Born in Epernay, Marne, he competed at the 2015 World Championships in Beaver Creek, USA, in the super combined. He achieved his first World Cup podium in January 2017, a second place in a super combined at Wengen.

During the 2021 world championship games Muzaton lost control during a turn and injured his knee.

World Cup results

Season standings

Race podiums
 0 wins
 1 podium – (1 AC); 8 top tens

World Championship results

Olympic results

References

External links

 
 French Ski Team – 2023 men's A team – 
 Rossignol Skis – Maxence Muzaton

People from Épernay
1990 births
French male alpine skiers
Living people
Université Savoie-Mont Blanc alumni
Alpine skiers at the 2018 Winter Olympics
Alpine skiers at the 2022 Winter Olympics
Olympic alpine skiers of France
Sportspeople from Marne (department)